The Encyclopaedia of Religion and Ethics is a 12-volume work (plus an index volume) edited by James Hastings, written between 1908 and 1921 and composed of entries by many contributors.  It covers not only religious matters but thousands of ancillary topics as well, including folklore, myth, ritual, anthropology, psychology, etc. It was originally published by T&T Clark in Edinburgh, and Charles Scribner's Sons in the United States.

Volumes
 A — Art
 Arthur — Bunyan
 Burial — Confessions
 Confirmation — Drama
 Dravidian — Fichte
 Fiction — Hyksos
 Hymns — Liberty
 Life and Death — Mulla
 Mundas — Phrygians
 Picts — Sacraments
 Sacrifice — Sudra
 Suffering — Zwingli
 Index

Sources
Several volumes are available from Google Books in "full view" mode. The first few volumes are available from the Internet Archive. It was reprinted by Kessinger Publishing in 2003, divided into 24 volumes without the index. Volume 13 (The Index) is available from Google Books in "limited view" mode and in full from the Internet Archive 
. Varda Books has also released an online edition (requires registration to view, requires payment to download).

References

External links
 List of religion dictionaries at Yale's library

Religion and Ethics
Religious studies books
20th-century encyclopedias